Spies Strike Silently (also known as Spies Kill Silently) is a 1966 Spanish-Italian Eurospy film written and directed by Mario Caiano and starring  Lang Jeffries.

Cast 

 Lang Jeffries as Michael Drum
 Emma Danieli as  Grace Holt
 Andrea Bosic as  Rachid
 Erika Blanc as  Pamela Kohler
 José Bódalo as Inspector Craig
 Mario Lanfranchi as Lt. Fouad	
  José Marco as  Harry Brook
  Enzo Consoli as  Edward
  Umberto Ceriani as Prof. Freeman
 Jesús Tordesillas as Prof. Roland Bergson
  María Badmajew as Jane Freeman 
  Gaetano Quartararo as Killer

References

External links

Italian spy thriller films
Spanish spy thriller films
1960s spy thriller films
Films directed by Mario Caiano
Films scored by Francesco De Masi
1960s Italian films
1960s Spanish films